The It's an Honour website is the Australian Government database of honours and awards.

The website is maintained by the Department of the Prime Minister and Cabinet.

References

External links
website

Orders, decorations, and medals of Australia